Çamlıca is a village in the Kaynaşlı District of Düzce Province in Turkey. Its population is 95 (2022).

References

Villages in Kaynaşlı District